Macedonians or Macedonian Bulgarians, sometimes also referred to as Macedono-Bulgarians, Macedo-Bulgarians, or Bulgaro-Macedonians are a regional, ethnographic group of ethnic Bulgarians, inhabiting or originating from the region of Macedonia. Today, the larger part of this population is concentrated in Blagoevgrad Province but much is spread across the whole of Bulgaria and the diaspora.

History

The Slavic-speaking population in the region of Macedonia had been referred to both (by themselves and outsiders) as Bulgarians, and that is how they were predominantly seen since 10th, up until the early 20th century. According to Encyclopædia Britannica, at the beginning of the 20th century the Macedonian Bulgarians constituted the majority of the population in the whole region of Macedonia, then part of the Ottoman Empire. The functioning of the Bulgarian Exarchate then aimed specifically at differentiating the Bulgarian from the Greek and Serbian populations on an ethnic and linguistic basis, providing the open assertion of a Bulgarian national identity. However one basic distinction between the political agendas of local intelligentsias was clear. The Macedonian Greeks and Serbs followed, in general, the directives coming from their respective centers of national agitation, while by the Bulgarians the term Macedonian was acquiring the significance of a certain political loyalty, that progressively constructed a particular spirit of regional identity. 

The Balkan Wars (1912–1913) and World War I (1914–1918) left Ottoman Macedonia divided between Greece, Serbia and Bulgaria and resulted in significant changes in its ethnic composition. The immediate effect of the partition of Ottoman Macedonia were the nationalistic campaigns in areas under Greek and Serbian administration, which expelled Bulgarian churchmen and teachers and closed Bulgarian schools and churches. As a consequence a sizable part of the Slavic population of Greek and Serbian (later Yugoslav Macedonia), fled to Bulgaria or was resettled there by virtue of a population exchange agreements (Treaty of Neuilly-sur-Seine, Politis-Kalfov Protocol). Within Greece, the Macedonian Slavs were designated "Slavophone Greeks", while within Serbia (later within Yugoslavia) they were officially treated as "South Serbs". In both countries, schools and the media were used to disseminate the national ideologies and identities, and also the languages, of the new ruling nations, the Greeks and the Serbs. These cultural measures were reinforced by steps to alter the composition of the population: Serb colonists were implanted in Yugoslav Macedonia, while in Greek Macedonia, the mass settlement of Greek refugees from Anatolia definitively reduced the Slav population to minority status.

Despite some attempts to differentiate a Slavic Macedonian identity from the Bulgarian one since the end of the 19th century, and despite the nebulous national consciousness of the mass of the Slavic population, most researchers agree that the bulk of the Slavic population in the region had a Bulgarian national identity until the early 1940s, when the Bulgarian troops, occupying most of the area, were greeted as liberators. Pro-Bulgarian feelings among the local Slavic population prevailed in Greece and Yugoslavia. After the Second World War and Bulgarian withdrawal, on the base of the strong Macedonian regional identity  a process of ethnogenesis started and distinct national Macedonian identity was formed. As a whole an appreciable Macedonian national consciousness prior to the 1940s did not exist. At that time even the political organization by the Slavic immigrants from the region of Macedonia, the Macedonian Patriotic Organization has also promoted the idea of Macedonian Slavs being Bulgarians. The nation-building process was politically motivated and later reinforced by strong Bulgarophobia and Yugoslavism. The new  authorities began a policy of removing of any Bulgarian influence and creating a distinct Slavic consciousness that would inspire identification with Yugoslavia. 

With the proclamation of the new Socialist Republic of Macedonia, there were measures taken that would overcome the pro-Bulgarian feeling among the population. It has been claimed that from 1944 till the end of the 1940s people espousing a Bulgarian ethnic identity had been oppressed. According to Bulgarian sources more than 100,000 men were imprisoned and some 1,200 prominent Bulgarians were sentenced to death. In addition, the inconsistent policy towards the Macedonian Bulgarians followed by Communist Bulgaria at that time has thrown most independent observers ever since into a state of confusion, as to the real ethnicity of the population even in Bulgarian Macedonia.  Practically as a consequence the rest of this people, with exception of Bulgaria proper, were eventually Macedonized or Hellenized.

Nevertheless, people with Bulgarian consciousness or Bulgarophile sentiments still live in North Macedonia and Greece. During the last years the EU membership of Bulgaria has seen more than 50,000 Macedonians applying for Bulgarian citizenship. In order to obtain it they must sign a statement declaring they are Bulgarians by origin. More than 90,000 Macedonian nationals have already received Bulgarian citizenship. However, this phenomenon can not give precise information about how many Macedonian nationals consider themselves Bulgarians in ethnic sense, because it is widely believed that this phenomenon is caused primarily for economic reasons.

See also
List of Macedonian Bulgarians
Bulgarians in North Macedonia
Bulgarians in Albania
Slavic-speakers of Greek Macedonia
Internal Macedonian Revolutionary Organization
Macedonia (terminology)
Macedonian nationalism

References

 
Ethnic groups in Macedonia (region)
History of Macedonia (region)
20th century in Bulgaria
Bulgaria–North Macedonia relations
 01
People from Blagoevgrad Province
Ethnic groups in Greece
Demographics of the Ottoman Empire
Slavic ethnic groups
Macedonian people of Bulgarian descent
South Slavs
Bulgarians from the Ottoman Empire